CKCET is a college of engineering and technology, located in Cuddalore, Tamil Nadu, India. It is a public institution, and was established in 2002. The college's chairman is CK Ranganathan and its  executive director is Amudhavalli Ranganathan. Previously, it was Jayaram Engineering College. It conducts courses in five main branches of engineering i.e., Civil, CSE, EEE, ECE, and Mechanical. The college also servers with its management course MBA. The chairman Mr.CK Ranaganathan is none other than the Chairman & Managing Director of CavinKare Pvt. Ltd. It has a well experienced and qualified faculty team.

See also
Education in India
Literacy in India
List of educational institutions in Cuddalore district
List of institutions of higher education in Tamil Nadu

References

External links
 
 Ck Civil Consultancy official website
 Ck Technical Symposium official website

Engineering colleges in Tamil Nadu
Education in Cuddalore district
Educational institutions established in 2002
2002 establishments in Tamil Nadu